Dark Genesis is a five-disc box set by American heavy metal band Iced Earth, released on November 27, 2001. It contains remastered versions of their first three studio albums (Iced Earth, Night of the Stormrider and Burnt Offerings), their rare demo Enter the Realm, and a newly recorded tribute CD, Tribute to the Gods, which contains covers of many songs that have influenced Iced Earth. The Tribute to the Gods CD was the last Iced Earth release to feature lead guitarist Larry Tarnowski, and the last to feature Matt Barlow until his 2007 return. As well, that same disc marked bassist James MacDonough's first Iced Earth disc since 1999, as he had been absent during the recording of Horror Show.

Misprinting Error
Once the Dark Genesis box set was released, reports started coming in of misprintings on the discs. Disc 1 (Enter the Realm) would play Disc 3 (Night of the Stormrider), Disc 2 (Iced Earth) would play Disc 4 (Burnt Offerings), Disc 3 would play Disc 1 and Disc 4 would play Disc 2. Disc 5 (Tribute to the Gods) remained true to its printing. This fault got back to Iced Earth, who quickly released a statement on their official website about how disappointed and embarrassed they were about the errors and gave everyone their humble apologies, despite not being their fault at all. It was announced that through investigations, 3000 of the 4000 shipped units were affected with this error. The statement also insisted fans to send back their error discs along with their names and addresses to Century Media’s head office and they’ll be replaced with new discs with the correct printings on them.

Track listing

Disc one
Enter the Realm remastered, 1989

Disc two
Iced Earth remastered, 1991

Disc three
Night of the Stormrider remastered, 1992

Disc four
Burnt Offerings remastered, 1995

Disc five
Tribute to the Gods, 2002

Personnel
 Jon Schaffer − rhythm guitar on all tracks, lead vocals on "Stormrider" and "God of Thunder"
 Gene Adam − vocals on discs 1 and 2
 Matt Barlow − vocals on discs 4 and 5
 John Greely − vocals on disc 3
 Randall Shawver − lead guitar on discs 1-4
 Larry Tarnowski − lead guitar on disc 5
 Dave Abell − bass guitar on discs 1-4
 James MacDonough − bass guitar on disc 5
 Greg Seymour − drums on disc 1
 Mike McGill − drums on disc 2
 Rick Secchiari − drums on Disc 3
 Rodney Beasley − drums on disc 4
 Richard Christy − drums on disc 5

References

Iced Earth compilation albums
2001 compilation albums
Albums with cover art by Travis Smith (artist)